The 2022 season was the Green Bay Packers' 102nd in the National Football League (NFL), their 104th overall and fourth under head coach Matt LaFleur.

The team achieved the most wins in NFL history when they beat the Chicago Bears in Week 13, who held the record at every season’s end since 1921 and were tied with the Packers for a three-week stretch leading up to the game.

After a 3–1 start, the Packers would suffer a five-game losing streak (their longest since 2008), tumbling to a 3–6 record before ending their losing streak against the Dallas Cowboys. Following a Week 8 loss to the Buffalo Bills, they failed to improve on their 13-4 record from the previous season. After falling to 4–8, they rallied to win four straight games and remain in the playoff hunt, but were eliminated from playoff contention when they lost the last game of the season to the Detroit Lions, ensuring the team their first losing season and non-playoff appearance since 2018.

Player movements

Trades

Free agents

Re-signings

Additions

Subtractions

Draft

Notes

Undrafted free agent additions

Roster cuts
The roster was cut to 53 on August 30, 2022.

Staff

Final roster

Preseason
The Packers' preseason opponents were announced on May 12.

Regular season
On May 4, the NFL announced that the Packers would play the New York Giants during Week 5 on October 9 at Tottenham Hotspur Stadium in London, as part of the league's International Series. The game would kickoff at 2:30 p.m. BST/8:30 a.m. CDT, and was televised by the NFL Network, with the Packers serving as the home team. Prior to 2022, the Packers were the only team that had yet to play in an international game. On May 11, the NFL announced that the Packers would host the Dallas Cowboys during Week 10 on November 13.

The remainder of the Packers' 2022 schedule, with exact dates and times, was announced on May 12.

Schedule
{| class="wikitable" style="text-align:center"
!style=""| Week
!style=""| Date
!style=""| Opponent
!style=""| Result
!style=""| Record
!style=""| Venue
!style=""| Recap
|-style="background:#fcc"
! 1
| September 11
| at Minnesota Vikings
| L 7–23
| 0–1
| U.S. Bank Stadium
| Recap
|-style="background:#cfc"
! 2
| September 18
| Chicago Bears
| W 27–10
| 1–1
| Lambeau Field
| Recap
|-style="background:#cfc"
! 3
| September 25
| at Tampa Bay Buccaneers
| W 14–12
| 2–1
| Raymond James Stadium
| Recap
|-style="background:#cfc"
! 4
| October 2
| New England Patriots
| W 27–24 
| 3–1
| Lambeau Field
| Recap
|-style="background:#fcc"
! 5
| October 9
| New York Giants
| L 22–27
| 3–2
|  Tottenham Hotspur Stadium 
| Recap
|-style="background:#fcc"
! 6
| October 16
| New York Jets
| L 10–27
| 3–3
| Lambeau Field
| Recap
|-style="background:#fcc"
! 7
| October 23
| at Washington Commanders
| L 21–23
| 3–4
| FedExField
| Recap
|-style="background:#fcc"
! 8
| October 30
| at Buffalo Bills
| L 17–27
| 3–5
| Highmark Stadium
| Recap
|-style="background:#fcc"
! 9
| November 6
| at Detroit Lions
| L 9–15
| 3–6
| Ford Field
| Recap
|-style="background:#cfc"
! 10
| November 13
| Dallas Cowboys
| W 31–28 
| 4–6
| Lambeau Field
| Recap
|-style="background:#fcc"
! 11
| 
| Tennessee Titans
| L 17–27
| 4–7
| Lambeau Field
| Recap
|-style="background:#fcc"
! 12
| November 27
| at Philadelphia Eagles
| L 33–40
| 4–8
| Lincoln Financial Field
| Recap
|-style="background:#cfc"
! 13
| December 4
| at Chicago Bears
| W 28–19
| 5–8
| Soldier Field
| Recap
|-
! 14
| colspan="6" |Bye
|-style="background:#cfc"
! 15
| 
| Los Angeles Rams
| W 24–12
| 6–8
| Lambeau Field
| Recap
|-style="background:#cfc"
! 16
| December 25
| at Miami Dolphins
| W 26–20
| 7–8
| Hard Rock Stadium
| Recap
|-style="background:#cfc"
! 17
| January 1
| Minnesota Vikings| W 41–17
| 8–8
| Lambeau Field
| Recap
|-style="background:#fcc"
! 18
| January 8
| Detroit Lions| L 16–20
| 8–9
| Lambeau Field
| Recap
|}Note: Intra-division opponents are in bold text.

Game summaries
Week 1: at Minnesota Vikings

Week 2: vs. Chicago Bears

Week 3: at Tampa Bay Buccaneers

Week 4: vs. New England Patriots

Week 5: vs. New York GiantsNFL London gamesWeek 6: vs. New York Jets

Week 7: at Washington Commanders

Week 8: at Buffalo Bills

Week 9: at Detroit Lions

Week 10: vs. Dallas Cowboys

Week 11: vs. Tennessee Titans

Week 12: at Philadelphia Eagles

Week 13: at Chicago Bears

Week 15: vs. Los Angeles Rams

Week 16: at Miami DolphinsChristmas Day gamesWeek 17: vs. Minnesota Vikings

Week 18: vs. Detroit Lions

Standings
Division

Conference

Statistics
Starters
Regular seasonOffenseDefense'''

Team leaders

League rankings

Awards

References

External links
 

Green Bay
Green Bay Packers seasons
Green Bay Packers